CKWR-FM is a Canadian radio station, broadcasting a community radio format at 98.5 FM in Kitchener, Ontario. The station has broadcast since 1973.

Their studios are located on 1446 King Street East in Kitchener while their transmitter is located on top of Kitchener City Hall.

History
CKWR is a not-for-profit radio station that serves the communities of Kitchener, Waterloo, Cambridge and Guelph. It was the first licensed community radio station in Canada, receiving a license in 1973. 

On July 21, 1997, the station received approval from the Canadian Radio-television and Telecommunications Commission (CRTC) to change CKWR-FM's frequency from 98.7 MHz to 98.5 MHz and increase the effective radiated power from 1,430 watts to 2,400 watts.  The change was to eliminate interference received from co-channel station CBCB-FM 98.7 MHz in Owen Sound.

Programming weekdays is adult album alternative with local news and community events announcements. Evenings are specialty programs, and weekends are multicultural.

References

External links
 FM 98.5 CKWR
 
 

Kwr
Kwr
Radio stations established in 1973
1973 establishments in Ontario